Non-recognition is the practice and legal obligation not to extend diplomatic recognition to annexations or de facto states created through violation of international law. It is a counterpart to the rejection of right of conquest in modern international law and the jus cogens norm of prohibition on the acquisition of territory through force.

References

International relations
Diplomatic recognition